Titley Priory was a priory near Titley in Herefordshire, England at .

References

Monasteries in Herefordshire